The Škoda Rapid is a fastback coupé designed and built by AZNP in Czechoslovakia between 1984 and 1990. Based on the rear-engined Škoda 105 120 and 130 saloon, it was a replacement for the Škoda Garde coupe built between 1981 and 1984 itself based upon the Škoda 105/120 sedan design, which was also called the Rapid in the UK market. Some Garde/Rapid cars were sent to Ludgate Design & Development in Kent, United Kingdom, by Škoda to be converted into convertibles.

The Škoda  Rapid was famous being described as "the poor man’s Porsche" after Autocar and Motor defined the Škoda Rapid "a beginners' course to the 911", as it had a rear-mounted engine and rear-wheel drive, just like the Porsche 911.

Today the Škoda Rapid is gaining in popularity as a classic car with Garde and convertible models being most sought after. According to the website "How Many Left?", there were a total of 50 Škoda Rapids left on British roads in 2011.

The Rapid name was originally used on 1930s Škoda models, and was revived again in 2011 on an Indian market  Rapid saloon, based on the Volkswagen Vento, and in 2012 on a Rapid hatchback for the international market.

The Rapid, and its predecessor Garde, were internally known as Type 743 models, with the later 135/136 Rapids being referred to as Type 747.

Specifications
The Rapid used a unibody structure and a rear-engine, rear-wheel-drive layout.
Front suspension was by double wishbones and coil springs. At the rear there were semi-trailing arms and coil springs, a major upgrade from the swing axle of earlier Škodas that gave safer and more predictable handling. Brakes were discs with four-pot calipers at the front, and drums at the rear.

The engine was a water-cooled, carburated, OHV inline four mounted longitudinally, slanted to the right and overhanging the rear axle. Power was sent to the rear wheels through a transaxle gearbox. Engine upgrades were introduced concurrently with the analogous ones of the Škoda 130 series saloon.

In the first years of production, Škoda Rapid 120 had 1174 cc  aluminium block, cast iron heads engine and four-speed gearbox carried over from its predecessor Škoda Garde. These first series were made in BAZ Bratislava and they were known for its unreliability.

The 1987 Rapid 136 introduced an upgraded 1.3, with new aluminium alloy 8-port cylinder heads.
The Rapid 135RIC was 1289cc and was fuel injected

Rapid Cabriolet

A convertible version of the Rapid was offered by Škoda GB on the British market. Standard Rapid coupés were imported and converted in the UK by specialist Ludgate Design & Development (LDD ltd.) in Kent, and were sold through the official Škoda dealerships. The cars retained their window frames, and were reinforced with additional chassis bracing and a T-shaped rollbar similar to the Triumph Stag's. At a total price of just under 5,000, the Rapid Cabriolet was the cheapest convertible on sale in the United Kingdom.

Gallery

References

Rapid
Coupés
Rear-engined vehicles
Cars introduced in 1984
Rear-wheel-drive vehicles
Cars discontinued in 1990